Cavite National High School  (Filipino: Pambansang Mataas na Paaralan ng Cavite) formerly known as Cavite High School, is a Secondary School located at the Cavite City in the Philippines. It was established on June 19, 1902, and it is the oldest national secondary school in the country.

History
On January 21, 1901, Act No. 74 of the Philippine Commission called for the organization of Public Schools in the Philippines.  The Provincial Board, then authorized by Act No. 372 were to establish secondary schools. The first campus was located at the Isthmus of Rosario, in the town of San Roque where Garita Elementary School now stands. Hon. Mariano Trias, then Governor of Cavite, suggested that a High School be established in Cavite, San Roque or Caridad.

The school was established on June 19, 1902, with 25 students mostly from the towns of Cavite, San Roque and Caridad.  However, classes could not start because of cholera, the buildings in bad condition, there were no desks, and building was unsanitary because it was used as a pig pen. Then Principal Sydney K. Michelle and Mr. Hammond H. Buck raised 100 pesos for the needed repairs.  On July 1, 1902, the school became operational with 30 students. On September 1, it became 61 and in November, it became 80.

In 1903, Cavite High School transferred to an old but spacious disputed government land where a Spanish hospital stands.  Student population continued to increase and during the same year, a debating society was organized among the advanced students.  Also, in 1904 and in 1905 respectively, a baseball team and a track and field team was established.  The Supreme Court however ordered that the land be returned to the Catholic Church.  Again, the school had to relocate at P. Gomez st. where the Spanish Provincial Governor used to reside.  In 1908, the High School saw its first five graduates, four males and one female.  In 1928, the school had to move to Caridad Preparatory before transferring to its present lot, a sprawling 6-hectare lot located donated by Caridad Estate of Cavite, Inc. through Mr. Hammond Buck who was engaged in the Bureau of Education prior to being engaged in real estate.

The 2-2 Plan, the new curriculum, was implemented in 1957 under the then Principal Jose T. Bernal.  Back then, Junior and Senior High School students were given the choice whether they preferred vocational, college preparatory or an elective curriculum.

Junior students were often sent to Cavite Naval Operating Base (now Cavite Naval Base) for their on-the-job training.  They could choose mechanical repairs, machinery operations, practical electricity, welding, sheetmetal, shipfitter, pipefitter or foundry. Boys underwent woodworking courses which were done in the school shop while girls underwent hair science and dressmaking and design courses in the Home Economics Laboratory.

Republic Act No. 3694 converted Cavite High School into Cavite National High School as approved by President Diosdado Macapagal on June 22, 1963.  The budget appropriated for such purpose was P250,000.00. In school year 1973–1974, student population was 5,959 while there were 207 teachers and employees.

The school admits more than 1,500 new freshmen students from elementary schools in the city as well as in neighboring towns. The present student population is almost 7,000 and there are more than 500 in the school's annex, Cavite National High School – Annex (Now Sangley Point National High School).

Publications
 Filipino – Ang Caviteñan
 English – The Caviteñan

Organizations
 Supreme Student Government SSG
 Youth for Environment in Schools Organization (YES-O)
 Academic Clubs
 Alchemist Club
 Robotics Club (Milkybots)
 Red Cross Youth (RCY)
 Barkada Kontra Droga (BKD)

Centenary celebration

2002 marked the centenary of Cavite National High Schools' founding.  Activities to celebrate this included:

Kaeskwela mo – an acquaintance party aiming to forge friendships and partnerships across the batches.  It was held on September 15, 2001, at the Montano Hall.
Bagong Gabaldon – the restoration of the Main Building of the campus has been one of the top priority of the executive committee as part of commemorating the event.
Sandaang Taon... – a book that documents the events that the school has experienced.
Mr. and Ms. CNHS – a pageant who searches for students who embody  the ideals of the school.
Gintong Kalabaw – awarding the Top 100 Excellent Alumni.
Balik Eskwela – for those who spent long years away from the City of Cavite, the local government will treat them to various festivities like the Christmas Festival.
Caviteño – a month-long celebration by the local government to boost local tourism in the city. Activities include Philippine National Anthem Day, the 104th Independence Day anniversary, Pan de San Antonio (Cavite's Pan Fiesta), Cavite High Centenary, Regada 2002, San Juan Barrio Fiesta, the Birth Anniversary of Ladislao Diwa and the Feast of St. Peter the Apostle, all of which are events celebrated during the month of June.

Gintong Kalabaw
June 14, 2002, Malacañan Palace, President Gloria Macapagal Arroyo awarded the Top 100 Alumni of Cavite National High School with the Gawad Gintong Kalabaw award.  Those who were present in the ceremony were the President, Education Secretary Raul Roco, Cavite Governor Erineo Maliksi and Representative Plaridel Abaya of the 1st District of Cavite at the Heroes Hall.

Two of the oldest alumni of Cavite National High School were also present and were awarded by the President.  They were Maria Rizalina Bautista Poblete of Batch 1926 and Honorato Vega of Batch 1931.
Along with them is Elmer Abueg, the President's Professor at the Ateneo de Manila University.

Principal
Principal IV Randie L. Salonga

Department heads
As of June 2020:
Mathematics – Fernan Estrañero
Values – Daisy B. Bautista
MAPEH – Dennies E. Reyes
TLE (Industrial Arts) – Josefina T. Justo
TLE (Home Economics) – Marissa M. Esteban
Science – Madelaine F. Gatchalian
Araling Panlipunan – Marita R. Untalan
English – Marvin Arnaldo 
Filipino – Jeaneveve P. Nonan

High schools in the Philippines
Schools in Cavite City